Chromel is an alloy made of approximately 90% nickel and 10% chromium by weight that is used to make the positive conductors of ANSI Type E (chromel-constantan) and K (chromel-alumel) thermocouples. Chromel is a registered trademark of Concept Alloys, Inc.

Chromel A
Chromel A is an alloy containing approximately 80% nickel and 20% chromium (by weight), with low-level quantities of Si (1%), Fe (0.5%), and Ni. It is used for its excellent resistance to high-temperature corrosion and oxidation. It is also commonly called Nichrome 80-20, and is used for electric heating elements.

Chromel C
Chromel C is an alloy containing 60% nickel, 16% chromium and 24% iron. It is also commonly called Nichrome 60 and is used for heating elements, resistance windings, and hot wire cutters.

Chromel-R 

Chromel R has a composition of Cr 20%, Ni 80%. 

Chromel-R was also produced as a woven fabric of chromel wires. It was developed by Litton Industries for use by NASA in the Gemini and Apollo programs. 

The Gemini G4C spacesuit did not use Chromel-R as standard. However the Gemini 9 mission was to test the use of the Astronaut Maneuvering Unit, a free-flying 'rocket pack'. To protect against the hot exhaust of its hydrogen peroxide engine, Gene Cernan's suit was given additional protection with an over-trouser layer of Chromel-R. The spacewalk during this flight gave a number of problems, with Cernan overheating and finding the suit difficult to move in it, with "all the flexibility of a rusty suit of armor". The Chromel-R layer was an integral part of the spacesuit, although the confined Gemini capsule did not require much movement until the spacewalk. Once pressurised, the suit became difficult to move in.

Smaller patches of Chromel-R formed an outer layer of the Apollo spacesuit where abrasion resistance was needed. These patches can be seen as silver-grey areas over the white Beta cloth of the main suit. Using patches, rather than an entire garment, avoided the flexibility problems with Gemini. The upper areas of the overshoes, the gloves and patches beneath the life support backpack were of Chromel-R. Gold-plated open-weave Chromel-R mesh has also been used as the reflecting surface for compact-folding parabolic antenna on spacecraft.

References and notes

External links
  Materials properties of thermocouple wires sold by Omega Engineering, Inc.
  Technical information on alloys at Electrovek-Steel Ltd.

Nickel–chromium alloys
Nickel alloys
Chromium alloys